The Kirkcaldy Beer Duties Act 1741 (15 Geo. II, c.8) was an Act of Parliament of the Parliament of Great Britain passed in 1742.

The Act placed a duty on all beer brewed or sold within the town of Kirkcaldy, which was set at two pennies Scots, or one-sixth of a penny sterling, on each Scots pint (about ) of beer.

The Act was repealed by the Statute Law Revision Act 1948.

Notes

References
The statutes at large from the 15th to the 20th year of King George III [vol. XVIII]; Charles Bathurst, London. 1765.
Chronological table of the statutes; HMSO, London. 1993. 

1741 in Scotland
Repealed Great Britain Acts of Parliament
Alcohol law in the United Kingdom
Great Britain Acts of Parliament 1741
History of Fife
Kirkcaldy
Alcohol in Scotland
Scottish laws